The Brain Drain is a BBC comedy panel show that ran for 2 series in the early 1990s.

Presented by Jimmy Mulville and featuring a panel of 4 performers (including regular panellists Tony Hawks and (in the 2nd series) Jo Brand), the show was essentially a comedy version of Question Time. Panellists were asked a question by a member of the studio audience (including occasional celebrity guests) to which they were invited to give a humorous response.

References

External links 

British comedy television shows
1992 British television series debuts
1993 British television series endings
1990s British comedy television series
BBC Television shows
British panel games
1990s British game shows
Television series by Hat Trick Productions
English-language television shows